Simon Langton (born 5 November 1941 in Amersham, Buckinghamshire) is an English television director and producer. He is the son of David Langton, the actor who played Richard Bellamy in Upstairs, Downstairs.

After he had directed many TV drama series and serials during the 1970s, his version of the John le Carré novel Smiley's People (1982, adapted by John Hopkins) was nominated for both a BAFTA Award in the UK, and an Emmy Award in the US. He also received a BAFTA nomination for the series Mother Love (1989), starring Diana Rigg.

He is perhaps best known for directing the adaptation of Pride and Prejudice (1995) starring Colin Firth and Jennifer Ehle, for which he was again nominated for a BAFTA. He directed episodes of Rosemary and Thyme and Midsomer Murders.

Filmography
 The Widowing of Mrs Holroyd (1976 TV film)
 Supernatural (1977 TV series) (directed 4 of 8 episodes)
 Rebecca (1979 miniseries)
 Thérèse Raquin (1980 miniseries)
 Smiley's People (1982 miniseries)
 I Remember Nelson (1982 miniseries)
 The Lost Honor of Kathryn Beck (1984 TV film)
 Act of Passion (1984 TV film)
 Anna Karenina (1985 TV film)
 The Whistle Blower (1986 film)
 Casanova (1987 TV film)
 Laguna Heat (1987 TV film)
 Mother Love (1989 miniseries)
 The Cinder Path (1994 miniseries)
 Pride and Prejudice (1995 miniseries)
 Forbidden Territory: Stanley's Search for Livingstone (1997 TV film)
 Nancherrow (1999 TV film)

References

External links
 

1941 births
Living people
English film directors
English television directors
People from Amersham